Alawa is a northern suburb of the city of Darwin, Northern Territory, Australia. It is bounded by Trower and Dripstone Roads, Lakeside Drive and the Rapid Creek. It is in the local government area of City of Darwin.

History
The suburb of Alawa was constructed in the late 1960s. Alawa is named after the Alawa Aboriginal tribe who inhabited an area on the southern tributaries. The street names in Alawa commemorate the residents and workers, at the old Post Office, who were killed in the bombing of Darwin by the Japanese in 1942, and the boats and people associated with the early settlement of Palmerston (Port Darwin).

Present day
Alawa's boundary borders the Casuarina Shopping centre. the largest shopping centre in the Territory. The suburb also has a primary school and a smaller shopping centre.

References

External links

https://web.archive.org/web/20070903185425/http://www.brmanagement.com.au/suburbsmap.html
https://web.archive.org/web/20110629040718/http://www.nt.gov.au/lands/lis/placenames/origins/greaterdarwin.shtml#t#t

Suburbs of Darwin, Northern Territory